Edmir Sali (born 7 August 1997) is an Albanian professional footballer who currently play as a goalkeeper for Albanian club Kastrioti Krujë.

References

1997 births
Living people
People from Vlorë County
People from Vlorë
Albanian footballers
Association football goalkeepers
Kategoria Superiore players
Kategoria e Parë players
Kategoria e Dytë players
Kategoria e Tretë players
Flamurtari Vlorë players
Flamurtari FC B players
KF Vlora players
KF Oriku players
KF Laçi players